Jacqueline Quentin Louison or J.Q. Louison is a writer and poet from Martinique.

Life 
Born in 1952 in Le Marin, into an average family of ten children. She obtained various scholarships, which enabled her to get an education after gaining her baccalaureate, and she pursued higher education in English-speaking studies, in metropolitan France. In 1979, she moved to West Africa where she lived for twenty-seven years, where her work included the role of Library Supervisor at the American Cultural Center at the U.S. Embassy to the Ivory Coast and teacher at the Lycée Classique Abidjan, among other responsibilities.

Jacqueline Louison was inspired to become a writer by watching Sugar Cane Alley as a young woman in 1983, which so moved her as a witness to history, she became convinced that she would do the same, as an author. She returned to Martinique in 2004, where she devoted herself to writing, publishing her first novel, Le canari brisé the following year. Between Europe, Africa, America and the Caribbean, J.Q. Louison evokes a spirituality and a humanity influenced by cultures that nevertheless shape them.

Work 
Her works often describe an Afro-Caribbean society where the spiritual plays an important role. Her characters are charismatic but are subject to a tumultuous destiny that always brings them face to face with their origins. She evokes the imaginary real (""), an expression of her own making, to explain the precision with which she describes parallel or fantastic worlds in her works, in a style reminiscent of René Barjavel or the evocation of the spiritual in the novels of Toni Morrison. 

Louison has said the following of her idea:

The work that best exemplifies this concept is her science fiction trilogy, The Murdered Crocodile, though the novel The Broken Canary was the first appearance of this idea in her writing.

Musical setting 
In 2009, artist Christina Goh accompanied the publication of J.Q. Louison's volume of poems, 'Emotions' with a piano-vocal recital of the songs featured in her single "3 emotions".

Publications 
 2005 Le canari brisé (novel)
 2006 Le crocodile assassiné (novel)
 2011 La fondation spirituelle des États-Unis d'Amérique (Doctoral thesis, summa cum laude - Université des Antilles et de la Guyane)
 2009 Emotions (collection of poems)
 2010 Cicatrices (short story collection)
 2011 Le poète est un peintre (collection of poems)
 2012 L'ère du serpent - Le crocodile assassiné volume 2 (novel) 
 2014 Le triomphe des crocodiles - Le crocodile assassiné volume 3 (novel)
 2014 Vision de l’aurore de félicité (collection of poems)
 2021 The She King (novel)

References 

1952 births
People from Le Marin
20th-century French women writers
French science fiction writers
21st-century French women writers